Red Bluff Provincial Park is a provincial park in British Columbia, Canada.

External links

Provincial parks of British Columbia
Regional District of Bulkley-Nechako
1978 establishments in British Columbia
Protected areas established in 1978